Tushkanovsky is a rural locality (a khutor) in Zakhopyorskoye Rural Settlement, Nekhayevsky District, Volgograd Oblast, Russia. The population was 215 as of 2010.

Geography 
Tushkanovsky is located on Kalach Upland, 23 km north of Nekhayevskaya (the district's administrative centre) by road. Rodnikovsky is the nearest rural locality.

References 

Rural localities in Nekhayevsky District